This is a list of members of the Supreme Advisory Council of Indonesia from 1968 until 1973.

Legend

Speakers and Deputy Speaker

Members

References 

Supreme Advisory Council
High Councils of State